Itaperuçu is a municipality in the state of Paraná in the Southern Region of Brazil. The name Itaperuçu in the indigenous Guaraní language means literally "to make the big path of the rock". From Itá = rock; peru: wander, hike, and ussu: big.

See also
List of municipalities in Paraná

References

Municipalities in Paraná